The Tunisia Davis Cup team represents Tunisia in Davis Cup tennis competition and are governed by the Fédération Tunisienne de Tennis.

Tunisia currently competes in Africa Zone Group III.

History
Tunisia competed in its first Davis Cup in 1982.

Tunisia was suspended from Davis Cup play for 2014, because the Tunisian Tennis Federation was found to have ordered Malek Jaziri not to compete against an Israeli, Amir Weintraub. Before the suspension, Tunisia was assigned to the Europe/Africa Zone of Group III. They competed in Group II on three occasions.

Current team (2022) 

 Skander Mansouri
 Moez Echargui
 Aziz Dougaz
 Malek Jaziri
 Aziz Ouakaa

See also
Davis Cup
Tunisia Fed Cup team

References

External links

Davis Cup teams
Davis Cup
Davis Cup